Gavin Gilbert Price  (born 29 October 1974 in Perth) is a Scottish professional football coach and former player. He played as a forward for Forfar Athletic, Kinnoull, Meadowbank Thistle, Brechin City, ADO Den Haag, St Johnstone, Stirling Albion and Altrincham.

After retiring as a player, Price managed junior clubs Kinnoull and Jeanfield Swifts. Elgin City manager Jim Weir, who had played with Price at St Johnstone, appointed him as his assistant in November 2014. After Weir left Elgin during the 2017–18 season, Price was appointed caretaker manager, and was given the position permanently on 12 October 2017.

Price was appointed a Member of the Order of the British Empire (MBE) in the 2020 Birthday Honours for his services to the community in Aberfeldy during the COVID-19 pandemic in Scotland.

Managerial statistics

References

1974 births
Living people
Footballers from Perth, Scotland
Scottish footballers
Association football forwards
Forfar Athletic F.C. players
Livingston F.C. players
Brechin City F.C. players
ADO Den Haag players
St Johnstone F.C. players
Stirling Albion F.C. players
Altrincham F.C. players
Scottish Football League players
Scottish expatriate footballers
Expatriate footballers in the Netherlands
Scottish football managers
Elgin City F.C. managers
Scottish Professional Football League managers
Members of the Order of the British Empire
Kinnoull F.C. managers
Jeanfield Swifts F.C. managers
Scottish Junior Football Association managers
Scottish Junior Football Association players
Eerste Divisie players